The Islamic State had its core in Iraq and Syria from 2013 to 2017 and 2019 respectively, where the proto-state controlled significant swathes of urban, rural, and desert territory. Today the group controls scattered pockets of land in the area, as well as territory or insurgent cells in other areas, notably Afghanistan, West Africa, the Sahara, Somalia, Mozambique, and the Democratic Republic of the Congo.

IS territory has declined substantially in almost every country since 2014, a result of the group's unpopularity and the military action taken against it. By late March 2019, IS territory in Syria was reduced to only the besieged  Syrian Desert pocket. The enclave was surrounded by Syrian government forces and its allies. The Syrian military conducted combing operations and airstrikes against the pocket, but with limited success. IS propaganda claims a peak territorial extent of 282,485km2.

The majority of IS-controlled territory, though much-diminished, continues to be in the desert in eastern Syria, in addition to isolated pockets elsewhere in the country. The majority of the Caliphate's territory, population, revenue, and prestige came from the territory it once held in Iraq and Syria. In Afghanistan, IS mostly controls territory near the Pakistan border and has lost 87% of its territory since spring 2015. In Lebanon, ISIL also controlled some areas on its border at height of Syrian war. In Libya, the group operates mostly as a moving insurgent force, occupying places before abandoning them again. In Egypt, the group controls 910km2 of land centered around the village of Sheikh Zuweid, which represents less than 1% of Egypt's territory. In Nigeria, Boko Haram (at the time an IS affiliate) controlled 6,041km2 of territory at its maximum extent in 2014, though most of this area was lost amid military reversals and a split within Boko Haram between pro- and anti-IS factions. By late 2019, however, IS's African forces had once again seized large areas in Nigeria; as of 2021, IS's African forces still run their own administrations in territories they control. As of 2022, most of IS's territory is confined to northeastern Nigeria and northern Mozambique.

Background 
The fifth edition of the Islamic State's Dabiq magazine explained the group's process for establishing new provinces. Jihadist groups in a given area must consolidate into a unified body and publicly declare their allegiance to the caliph. The group must nominate a Wāli (Governor), a Shura Council (religious leadership), and formulate a military strategy to consolidate territorial control and implement IS's version of Sharia law. Once formally accepted, IS considers the group to be one of its provinces and gives it support. Dabiq has acknowledged support in regions including East Turkestan, Indonesia and the Philippines, and claimed that IS would eventually establish wilayat in these areas after forming direct relationships with its supporters there.

Overview 
IS spokesman Abu Muhammad al-Adnani said "the legality of all emirates, groups, states and organizations becomes null by the expansion of the khilafah's [caliphate's] authority and arrival of its troops to their areas." IS thus rejects the political divisions established by Western powers during World War I in the Sykes–Picot Agreement as it absorbs territory in Syria and Iraq. The Long War Journal writes that the logical implication is that the group will consider preexisting militant groups like Al-Qaeda in the Arabian Peninsula (AQAP) and Al-Qaeda in the Islamic Maghreb (AQIM) illegitimate if they do not nullify themselves and submit to IS's authority.

While branches in Libya and Egypt have been very active and attempted to exercise territorial control, branches in other countries like Algeria and Saudi Arabia have been less active and do not seem to have a strong presence.

Since 2022, there have been no further provinces officially announced by IS. This is despite the group receiving public pledges of allegiance from militants in countries like Somalia, Bangladesh and the Philippines, and subsequently releasing statements and videos from those regions through its official media channels. Analyst Charlie Winter speculates that this is due to the lackluster performance of many of IS's existing provinces, and that IS's leadership seems to be identifying new affiliates as simply "soldiers of the caliphate."

Loss of "caliphate" territory led IS to conduct more terrorist attacks abroad.

Specific territorial claims 
The Islamic State primarily claimed territory in Syria and Iraq, subdividing each country into multiple wilayah (provinces), largely based on preexisting governance boundaries. The first territorial claims by the group outside of Syria and Iraq were announced by its leader, Abu Bakr al-Baghdadi, on 13 November 2014, when he announced new wilayats, or provinces, in Libya (Wilayah Barqah, Wilayah Tarabulus, and Wilayah Fazan), Algeria (Wilayah al-Jazair), Sinai, Egypt (Wilayah Sinai), Yemen (Wilayah al-Yaman), and Saudi Arabia (Wilayah al-Haramayn). In 2015, new provinces were also announced in the Afghanistan–Pakistan border (Wilayah Khurasan), Northern Nigeria (Wilayah Gharb Ifriqiyyah), the North Caucasus (Wilayah al-Qawqaz), and the Sahel (Sahil).

Lebanon and Tunisia 
On 9 December 2022, the group released a series of photographs depicting fighters allegedly in Lebanon and declaring Lebanon as a province, as well as the revival of the Tunisian province.

Iraq and Syria 

When the Iraq-based insurgent group Mujahideen Shura Council announced it was establishing an Islamic State of Iraq in October 2006, it claimed authority over seven Iraqi provinces: Baghdad, Al Anbar, Diyala, Kirkuk, Saladin, Nineveh, and parts of Babil.

When the group changed its name to Islamic State of Iraq and the Levant and expanded into Syria in April 2013, it claimed nine Syrian provinces, covering most of the country and lying largely along existing provincial boundaries: Al Barakah (al-Hasakah Governorate), Al Khayr (Deir ez-Zor Governorate), Raqqa, Homs, Halab, Idlib, Hamah, Damascus, and Latakia. It later subdivided the territory under its control to create the new provinces of al-Furat, Fallujah, Dijlah, and al-Jazirah. On 9 December 2017 Iraqi military forces announced the war against IS in Iraq had been won and that they no longer controlled territory in Iraq. In June 2017 IS affiliate Khalid ibn al-Walid Army Started referring to themselves as "Wilayat Hawran", one month later IS media started referring to all its claims in Syria as "Wilayat al-Sham".

Since mid-2018, IS has referred to its territory in the Levant simply as Wilayat al-Sham and has done the same with Iraq calling it Wilayat al-Iraq, but still continues to acknowledge and use references to specific regions in those territories, this has also been done with its claims in Yemen and Libya.

As of 2022, the group seems to have increased its efforts in Syria compared to Iraq, and has been reduced to several pockets in the Syrian desert, with local tribesmen acting as informants for the U.S. and other coallition forces. Despite this, the group managed to orchestrate a major prison break in January 2022.

Afghanistan and Pakistan 

On 29 January 2015, Hafiz Saeed Khan, Abdul Rauf and other militants in the region swore an oath of allegiance to Abu Bakr al-Baghdadi. Khan was subsequently named as the Wāli (Governor) of a new branch in Afghanistan and Pakistan called Khurasan Province, named after the historical Khorasan region.

IS attempted to establish themselves in Southern Afghanistan, especially in Kandahar and Helmand provinces, but were resisted by Taliban forces. They were able to establish a foothold in parts of Nangarhar, and recruited disaffected members of the Taliban. In August 2015, the Islamic Movement of Uzbekistan leader, Usman Ghazi, swore allegiance to IS and announced that the group should be considered part of Wilayah Khorasan.

The group suffered reversals in 2016, losing control of some territory in the wake of attacks from US Forces, the Afghan Government and the Taliban. Hafiz Saeed Khan was reportedly killed in a US drone strike in eastern Afghanistan on 25 July 2016.

In 2019, the group announced a new Pakistan province (Wilayah Pakistan). Despite this, as of 2022, the Khorasan province continues to operate in the country, also operating against neighboring Uzbekistan and Tajikistan, where some members have suggested that a Movarounnahr (or Transoxiana) province is established. In July 2022, a tajik-language magazine called Al-Azaim Tajiki was endorsed by the group, named after Yusuf Tajiki, a propagandist for the group killed by the Taliban.

Since the Taliban's 2021 offensive, which ended with the takeover of Kabul and the end of the 20-year war in the country, ISKP have become a new focus for the group, with its funding and numbers increasing as a result of prison breaks of IS fighters during the offensive and subsequent recruiting. Efforts have also increased to recruit fighters from neighboring Uzbekistan.

Libya 

IS divides Libya into three historical provinces, claiming authority over Cyrenaica in the east, Fezzan in the desert south, and Tripolitania in the west, around the capital.

In 2014, a number of leading IS commanders arrived in the city of Derna, which had been a major source of fighters in the Syrian civil war and Iraqi insurgency. Over a number of months, they united many local militant factions under their leadership and declared war on anyone who opposed them, killing judges, civic leaders, local militants who rejected their authority, and other opponents. On 5October 2014, the militants, who by then controlled part of the city, gathered to pledge allegiance to Abu Bakr al-Baghdadi. In February 2015, IS forces took over parts of the Libyan city of Sirte. In the following months, they used it as a base to capture neighbouring towns including Harawa, and Nofaliya. IS began governing Sirte and treating it as the capital of their territory.

IS suffered reversals from mid-2015 when they were expelled from much of Derna following clashes with rival militants, following months of intermittent fighting, IS eventually redeployed to other parts of Libya. Its leader Abu Nabil al-Anbari was killed in a U.S. air strike in November 2015. Libya's Interim Government launched a major offensive against IS territory around Sirte in May 2016, capturing the city by December 2016.

The group's current leader is Abdul Bara al Sahrawi, who replaced Adnan Abu Walid al Sahrawi after his death in August 2021.

Egypt 

The Egyptian militant group Ansar Bayt al-Maqdis swore allegiance to IS in November 2014. After al-Baghdadi's speech on 13 November, the group changed its name to Sinai Province on the Twitter feed claiming to represent the group. The group has carried out attacks in Sinai.

On 29 February 2017, the group announced a new "Misr" province in Egypt in a propaganda video against Coptic Christians.

As of 2022, the group continues to attack local infrastructure, but has diminished due to persistent counterterrorism efforts by the Egyptian government and armed forces, who operate with the assistance of local tribesmen.

Saudi Arabia 
Al-Baghdadi announced a Wilayah in Saudi Arabia in November 2014, calling for the overthrow of the Saudi Royal Family and criticizing the Kingdom's participation in the US-led coalition against IS. The group has carried out attacks in the country under the names of Najd Province and Hejaz Province.

Yemen 

IS established a Yemeni Wilayah in November 2014. The branch's first attack occurred in March 2015, when it carried out suicide bombings on two Shia Mosques in the Yemeni capital. At least eight ISIL Wilayat, named after existing provincial boundaries in Yemen, have claimed responsibility for attacks, including 'Adan Abyan Province, Al-Bayda Province, Hadramawt Province, Shabwah Province and Sana'a Province. Following the outbreak of the Yemeni Civil War in 2015, IS struggled to establish much of a presence in the country in the face of competition from the larger and more established Al-Qaeda in the Arabian Peninsula (AQAP) militant group. Many of IS's regional cells in Yemen have not been visibly active since their establishment and the group has not been able to seize control of territory the way they have done in Iraq and Syria. The group has also experienced leadership turmoil and defections from its rank and file.

As of 2022, the group, which continues to be weakened, serves a key financial intermediary between Somalia and Khorasan provinces.

Algeria 

Members of a militant group named Jund al-Khilafah swore allegiance to IS in September 2014. IS in Algeria gained notoriety when it beheaded French tourist Hervé Gourdel in September 2014. On 13 November 2014, Abu Bakr al-Baghdadi announced that the group had changed its name to "Wilayah al-Jazair" in accordance to the structure of the rest of groups aligned with IS. Algerian security forces killed the group's leader, Khalid Abu-Sulayman, in December 2014, and five of its six commanders in a May 2015 raid. Since then, the group has not claimed any significant attacks and has largely been silent.

Nigeria and West Africa 

On 7 March 2015, Boko Haram's leader Abubakar Shekau pledged allegiance to IS via an audio message posted on the organisation's Twitter account. Abu Mohammad al-Adnani welcomed the pledge of allegiance, and described it as an expansion of the group's caliphate to West Africa. IS publications from late March 2015 began referring to members of Boko Haram as part of Wilayat Gharb Ifriqiyyah (Islamic State's West Africa Province). Boko Haram suffered significant reversals in the year following the pledge of allegiance, with an offensive by the Nigerian military, assisted by neighboring powers, driving them from much of the territory they had seized in North East Nigeria. Boko Haram suffered a split in 2016, with IS appointing 'Abu Musab al-Barnawi' as the group's new leader, due to disagreements with Abubakar Shekau's leadership. This was rejected by Shekau and his supporters, who continued to operate independently.

On 24 January 2022, the small town of Gudumbali was captured and declared as the province's capital. However, it was recaptured by Nigerian troops on 26 January.

In the summer of 2022, ISWAP made several territorial gains in Nigeria.

As of September 2022, the group continues to maintain its stronghold in northeastern Nigeria, and has again integrated or eclipsed its former competitor Boko Haram, as several fighters have rejoined the group. The group also orchestrated a prison break in July, near Abuja.

North Caucasus 

IS militants in Syria issued a threat to Russian President Vladimir Putin in 2014: "we will liberate Chechnya and the entire Caucasus, God willing. Your throne has already teetered, it is under threat and will fall when we come to you because Allah is truly on our side." In early 2015, commanders of the militant Caucasus Emirate group in Chechnya and Dagestan announced their defection and pledge of allegiance to Abu Bakr al-Baghdadi. In a June 2015 audio statement posted online, IS spokesman Abu Mohammad al-Adnani accepted the pledges of allegiance and appointed Abu Muhammad al-Qadari (Rustam Asildarov) as Governor of a new Caucasus Province. He called on other militants in the region to join with and follow al-Qadari. The group has carried out occasional, low-level attacks since then. Russian security services killed Rustam Asildarov in December 2016.

Gaza 

In February 2014, the Mujahideen Shura Council in the Environs of Jerusalem declared its support for ISIL. On 2April 2015, elements of this group, along with members of the Army of Islam and the Gaza faction of Ansar Bait al-Maqdis, formed the Sheikh Omar Hadid Brigade, also known as Islamic State in Gaza, as it predominantly operates in the Gaza Strip.

Somalia 

The Islamic State in Somalia (ISS) is active since 2015, and though it remains a small militia of around 300 fighters, it has been considered possible by experts that ISS controls a number of villages in Puntland's hinterland. Furthermore, the group managed to capture and hold the town of Qandala for over a month in late 2016. At first, ISS did not receive official recognition by the Islamic State, however, this was subsequently granted by December 2017.

As of 2022, the group serves as an intermediary for IS provinces in Africa and the leadership based in Syria and Iraq. It also finances ISKP via Yemen.

East Asia 

Abu Sayyaf is IS's most powerful affiliate in the Philippines; another IS-affiliated group is the Maute group. Both groups worked together with other IS affiliates to seize parts of Marawi City on 23 May 2017, starting the Battle of Marawi.

On 16 October, IS's Emir of Southeast Asia Isnilon Hapilon, along with the Maute group's remaining leader Omar Maute was killed by the Armed Forces of the Philippines. Previously, the Maute group's co-leader and Omar's brother Abdullah Maute, as well as their other five male siblings, have been neutralized by the ongoing counter-offensives. Two days after the leaders' death, the Armed Forces of the Philippines said Malaysian terrorist and senior commander Mahmud Ahmad is also presumed killed in another operation.

The Battle of Marawi was declared over by 23 October by the government, at which point all participating militants have been successfully neutralized, effectively blocking IS's Asian expansion. The government wiped out the Maute group after the battle.

In December 2017, remnants of the Maute group started recruiting new members to form a new group called "Turaifie Group" whose leader, Abu Turaifie, claimed himself to be a successor of former leader Abu Sayyaf Isnilon Hapilon.

As of 2022, only pockets in Indonesia and the Philippines remain, and major attacks have decreased as a result of successful counterterrorism efforts by the governments of both states.

Democratic Republic of the Congo 

In October 2017, a video emerged on pro-IS channels that showed a small number of militants in the Democratic Republic of the Congo who declared to be part of the "City of Monotheism and Monotheists" (MTM) group. The leader of the group went on to say that "this is Dar al-Islam of the Islamic State in Central Africa" and called upon other like-minded individuals to travel to MTM territory in order to join the war against the government. The Long War Journal noted that though this pro-IS group in Congo appeared to be very small, its emergence had gained a notable amount of attention from IS sympathizers. On 24 July 2019, a video was released referring to IS's presence in the country as the Central African Wilayat showing fighters pledging allegiance to Abu Bakr al-Baghdadi.

As of 2022, the group has doubled its territory and increased its numbers as a result of orchestrated prison breaks, with 2,000 prisoners freed since 2020.

Mozambique 

After taking control of the Mozambican town of Mocímboa da Praia during an offensive in August 2020, local IS insurgents declared it the capital of their province. The militants consequently expanded further by capturing several islands in the Indian Ocean, with Vamizi Island being the most prominent.

In May 2022, the province was separated from Central Africa Province and became known as the Mozambique Province (ISM).

India 
It operates in India and the Kashmir region through its Islamic State Jammu & Kashmir (ISJK/ISISJK) branch, which had begun operating in February 2016. The Islamic State – Khorasan Province declared Wilayah [Wilayat] al-Hind (India Province) for IS on 11 May 2019 after clashes in Jammu and Kashmir in which ISJK leader Ishfaq Ahmad Sofi had been killed.

Shafi Armar, a former member of the Indian Mujahideen, became the chief of operations for the IS in India. He and his brother Sultan Armar founded the Indian ISIS affiliates Ansar-ut Tawhid fi Bilad al-Hind and Janood-ul-Khalifa-e-Hind. Janood-ul-Khalifa-e-Hind has published the pro-IS propaganda magazine Sawt al-Hind since February 2020.

Bangladesh 

Islamic State – Bengal Province (Wilayat al-Bengal) is the province of IS in Bangladesh, it operates through the group Islamic State Bangladesh (ISB/ISISB) and has claimed attacks in the country since October 2015. Neo-Jamaat-ul-Mujahideen Bangladesh, an offshoot of Jamaat-ul-Mujahideen Bangladesh, also operates as its branch.

The first emir of Wilayat al-Bengal, Abu Ibrahim al-Hanif, is believed to be  (born as Sajit Chandra Debnath, 1982)
a Bangladeshi Japanese economist who went to Syria in 2015 and joined IS. A Hindu convert to Islam, he reportedly lead the 2016 Dhaka attack. He was detained in Iraq in 2019 and Abu Muhammed al-Bengali was announced as the new emir of the province.

Azerbaijan 
On 2 July 2019, as part of a series of videos showing supporters and fighters of IS around the world renewing their pledge of allegiance to IS, a video was published from Azerbaijan featuring three fighters armed with Kalashnikov style rifles pledging their allegiance to Abu Bakr al-Baghdadi. The video was formally released by IS declaring it the Azerbaijan Wilayat.

Turkey 
Wilayat Turkey was formally declared in July 2019 when a video was published by IS featuring Turkish jihadists giving their bay'ah to the group's leader Abu Bakr al-Baghdadi. Reference was also made to the Wilayat prior to its formal introduction, in April 2019 in a video featuring the group's leader Abu Bakr al-Baghdadi in his second ever video appearance, and first appearance in five years, he was seen holding dossiers from various Wilayats the group claims one of which was labeled as Wilayat Turkey, which was the first known such usage as a reference to the Turkish Wilayat.

Administrative organization

Provinces 
The Islamic State's main base of operations was in their territory of Ar-Raqqah in Syria, until 2017, where it was recaptured by the Syrian Democratic Forces. From there, orders were given to affiliate groups, called wilayat, spread across the Levant, Asia and Africa. Few of these wilayat have declared their capital cities, with the exception of al-Sham with Ar-Raqqah, al-Iraq with Mosul, and Central Africa with Mocímboa da Praia. It also had claims on the entirety of the Muslim world, including Central Asia, the former Ottoman Balkans, South East Asia, and the northern part of Africa. Other times, however, it expressed also a desire for world domination, with undefined wilayat in the entirety of the old world as well as the new world.
{|class=wikitable
!Wilayah(Province)
!Part of
!Subdivisions /Former Wilayat
!Established(as a wilayah)
|-
| Algeria(al-Jazâ’ir)
|
|
|13 November 2014
|-
| Azerbaijan
|
|
|2 July 2019
|-
| Bahrain
|
|
|November 2014
|-
| Bengal(al-Bengal)
|
|
|September 2016
|-
| Caucasus(al-Qawqâz)
|
|Azerbaijan
|23 June 2015
|-
| Central Africa(Wasat Ifrîqiyâ)
| Congo
|
|Before August 2018
|-
| East Asia
|
|
|2014
|-
| Gaza
|
|
|2014
|-
| Greater Sahara(Sahil)
|
|
|15 May 2015
|-
|rowspan=4 | Haramayn
|rowspan=4 |
|-
|Bahrain
|rowspan=3 |13 November 2014
|-
|Hejaz
|-
|Najd
|-
| Hejaz
|
|
|November 2014
|-
| India(al-Hind)
|
|Khorasan (partial)
|11 May 2019
|-
|rowspan=16 | Iraq(al-Iraq)
|rowspan=16 | (partial)
|-
|al-Janub
|rowspan=16 |29 June 2014
|-
|al-Anbar
|-
|al-Badia
|-
|Baghdad
|-
|Dijlah
|-
|Dayala
|-
|Fallujah
|-
|Karkuk
|-
|Ninawa
|-
|Salahuddin
|-
|Shamal Baghdad
|-
|al-Furat
|-
|al-Jazirah
|-
|al-Barakah (partial)
|-
|al-Khayr (partial)
|-
|rowspan=3| Khorasan(Khurâsân)
|rowspan=3|
|-
|India
|rowspan=2|26 January 2015
|-
|Pakistan
|-
|rowspan=4 | Libya
|rowspan=4 |
|-
|Cyrenaica (Barqa)
|rowspan=3 |13 November 2014
|-
|Fezzan (Fazzân)
|-
|Tripolitania (Tarâbulus)
|-
| Egypt(Misr)
|
|
|February 2017
|-
| Mozambique
|
|
|May 2022
|-
| Najd
|
|
|November 2014
|-
| Pakistan
|
|
|15 May 2019
|-
| [[Islamic State – Sinai Province|Sinai<small>(Sînâ)</small>]]
|
|
|13 November 2014
|-
| Somalia(al-Somal)
|
|
|December 2017 (Recognition)
|-
|rowspan=13 | Syria(al-Sham)
|rowspan=13 | (partial) Akrotiri & Dhekelia Turkey (partial)
|-
|Ar-Raqqah
|rowspan=12 |29 June 2014
|-
|Dimashq
|-
|Idlib
|-
|Halab
|-
|Hama
|-
|Hawran / Horan
|-
|Hims
|-
|al-Barakah
|-
|al-Khayr
|-
|al-Badia (partial)
|-
|al-Furat (partial)
|-
|al-Jazirah (partial)
|-
| Turkey
|
|
|July 2019
|-
| Tunisia(Tunis)
|
|
|2015
|-
| West Africa(Garb Ifrīqīyā)
|
|Greater Sahara
|20152016 (after split with Boko Haram)March 2022 (autonomy granted)
|-
|rowspan=10 | Yemen(al-Yaman)
|rowspan=10 |
|-
|Sana'a
|rowspan=9 |13 November 2014
|-
|'Adan Abyan
|-
|Hadramawt
|-
|al-Bayda
|-
|Lahij
|-
|Ma'rib
|-
|Shabwah
|-
|Ataq
|-
|Green Brigade
|-
|}

 Ministries 
In addition to its territorial administration, the group also established dāwāwīn (ministries) for the political administration of the quasi-state under al-Baghdadi's administration, modelled after Abu Ayyub al-Masri's infrastructure for the Islamic State of Iraq.

{| class="sortable wikitable"
!Dīwān / Ministry
!Date of creation
!Function
|-
|Education and TeachingDiwan al-Tarbiyya wa al-Ta’lim || July 2014 || Responsible for education in a regular and extremist context. Its first minister was Reda Seyam.
|-
|ServicesDiwan al-Khidamat || June 2014 || Responsible for the administration of public spaces, such as parks and roads. One example of the latter was the construction of "Caliphate Way", a highway built in the industrial area of Mosul, which reduced congestion in the area.
|-
|Rikaz{{efn|Another official name is the Diwan of Resources, and it is also known as the Diwan of Natural Resources or the Diwan of Precious Resources.}}Diwan al-Rikaz || ? || Responsible for handling and exploitation of profitable resources. Its two known divisions handle fossil fuels (e.g. petroleum) and antiquities.
|-
|Da'wah and Masajid (and Awqaf)Diwan al-Da’wah wa al-Masajid (wa al-Awqaf) || ? || Responsible for Dawah and mosque and religious staff administration.
|-
|HealthDiwan al-Sihha || June 2014 || Responsible for health services and hospitals. An "Islamic State Health Service" was established in 2015, featuring a logo modelled after the one used by the British National Health Service. All medical schools served under this ministry rather than the Ministry of Education.
|-
|Tribal RelationsDiwan al-Asha'ir || ? || Responsible for dealing with nomadic tribes in the core region of IS. While the group committed atrocities against tribes such as Al-Shaitat and documents obtained after the group's loss of territory reflect a harsh tone against the nomadic groups, other documents show organized deliveries of supplies to the same groups. This dīwān was also known as an Office.
|-
|Public SecurityDiwan al-Amn (al-Aam) || ? || Responsible for public security and anti-espionage operations.
|-
|Zakah Diwan al-Zakah || June 2014 || Responsible for the collection and distribution of the Zakah.
|-
|TreasuryDiwan Bayt al-mal || ? || Responsible for the finances of the group and the dinar. Its Diwan al-Musadara is responsible for expropriations and is based on medieval Islam.
|-
|HisbahDiwan al-Hisbah || ? || The Hisbah (religious police) served this ministry, being in charge of enforcing the group's version of Islamic jurisprudence (sharia law) in public.
|-
|Judgement and GrievancesDiwan al-Qada wa al-Mazalim || ? || Responsible for enforcing and clarifying judicial matters (e.g. Islamic court) and family and marriage-related issues. Also based in medieval Islam.
|-
|Public RelationsDiwan al-Alaqat al-Amma || ? || Public relations (PR) department.
|-
|AgricultureDiwan al-Zira'a || June 2014 || Responsible for the regulation of agriculture and livestock. A RAND study revealed that harvests in IS territory were relatively normal, with commercial vehicle traffic increasing under the new administration. Only with the loss of territory and access to resources such as electricity did harvests begin to decay around 2016.
|-
|Fatwa and InvestigationDiwan al-Ifta' wa al-Buhuth || ? || Responsible for issuing and clarifying fatwas. It also wrote and published text media used in training camps through its publishing body Maktabat al-Himma.
|-
|SoldieryDiwan al-Jund || ? || Responsible for the Army of the Islamic State and its management, training and distribution. It is sometimes referred to as the "Soldiers Department".
|-
|MediaDiwan al-I'lam al-Markazi || ? || Responsible for the publishing bodies of the Islamic State, such as AlHayat Media Center, al-Furqan Media Foundation, Al-Bayan radio, Ajnad Foundation, Al-Naba, and Maktabat al-Himma. It is also in charge of the publication of magazines Dabiq, Dar al-Islam, Konstantiniyye, Istok, and later on Rumiyah. Additionally, it's the ministry in charge of translations.
|-
| Fay' and Ghana'imDiwan al-Fay' wa al-Ghana'im || ? || Responsible for administering and distributing war spoils that come from battles.
|-
|Real EstateDiwan al-'Aqarat wa al-Kharaj || ? || Responsible for real estate seized from non-Muslims or abandoned by its original owners in order to accommodate regular and new fighters or civilians.
|}

 Regional administrative offices 

Islamic State had created various regional offices during the period (2017-2019) to organize & direct its human and other resources & reviving its external operational capability. 

The “most vigorous and best-established” of IS’s offices set up at the Centre to oversee the wilayats are:

Al-Siddiq office in Afghanistan, which “covers South Asia and, according to some UN Member States, Central Asia”;

Al-Karrar office in Somalia, which also covers Mozambique and the Democratic Republic of the Congo (DRC); and

Al-Furqan office in the Lake Chad basin, where the borders of Niger, Chad, Cameroon, and Nigeria converge. The Furqan office covers these states in North Africa and the broader western Sahel, overseeing ISGS/ISSP.

IS’s other “three regional offices are low-functioning or moribund”, says the Monitoring Team, and these are:

Al-Anfal office in Libya, which covered “parts of northern Africa and the Sahel”;

The Umm al-Qura office “based in Yemen and … responsible for the Arabian Peninsula”; and

The Zu al-Nurayn office in the Sinai Peninsula “responsible for Egypt and the Sudan”.

 Notes 

 References 

 Works cited 

 
 
 
 

 External links 
 From Syria to Bosnia: Isis and its affiliates around the world, The Guardian''
 Islamic State moves in on al-Qaeda turf, BBC

Islamic State of Iraq and the Levant
Pan-Islamism
Territorial disputes
Separatism in Iraq
Totalitarian states
Former countries in the Middle East
Former countries in South Asia